Liam Lindstrom (born January 12, 1985 ) is a Swedish-Canadian ice hockey player, who grew up mainly in Sweden. He was drafted by the Phoenix Coyotes in the 2003 draft. His last North American team was the Phoenix RoadRunners of the ECHL.

Born in Edmonton, Alberta, Lindstrom is the son of former Edmonton Oiler Willy Lindström.

Career statistics

Regular season and playoffs

International

External links

1985 births
Canadian ice hockey centres
Living people
Arizona Coyotes draft picks
Phoenix RoadRunners players
Ice hockey people from Edmonton
Swedish ice hockey players